WLLW (101.7 FM) is a radio station broadcasting a classic rock format. Licensed to Geneva, New York, United States, the station is currently owned by Upstate Media Group, Inc., and features programming from Westwood One.

History
The station went on the air as WECQ-FM on May 29, 1981, with a Mainstream Top 40 format with an affiliate of American Top 40 with Casey Kasem as CQ-102. On June 3, 1993, the station changed its call sign and format to Country as WFLK, and on September 1, 2016, to the current WLLW.

The live/local morning show airs weekdays from 5am-10am. The longtime host is "The Small Guy". Over his tenure, he has been joined by a few different female sidekicks with the current sidekick: Missy.

Sunday Mornings; the station features classic country on their show: The Country Music Hall Of Fame Show. The program has been hosted for over 15 years by Marty Kerfien and is sponsored by Magee Diner in Waterloo, NY; it airs from 9 am - 12 pm EST.

On September 1, 2016, WFLK changed their call letters to WLLW and changed their format from country to classic rock, branded as "101.7 The Wall". The WLLW calls and classic rock format moved from 99.3 FM Seneca Falls, NY, which switched to classic hits under the WFLK calls.

Previous logo

References

External links
 Official Website
 

LLW (FM)